Mammoth Cave is a large limestone cave  south of the town of Margaret River in south-western Western Australia, and about  south of Perth.  It lies within the Leeuwin-Naturaliste National Park and is surrounded by karri and marri forest. There have been extinct animal fossils found in Mammoth Cave.

Exploration
It has been known from about 1850 to European settlers of the Margaret River district, but it was not explored until 1895. Its first explorer, Tim Connelly, who was appointed caretaker of the cave, conducted tours by lamplight until 1904 when electric lighting was installed.

Fossils

The cave has been studied for over a century. It has yielded fossils of Pleistocene fauna over 35,000 years old, including those of thylacines and the giant marsupial herbivore Zygomaturus.

Notes

External links
 

Show caves in Australia
Pleistocene paleontological sites of Australia
Margaret River, Western Australia
Limestone caves
Caves of Western Australia
Leeuwin-Naturaliste National Park